China Railways 22B rolling stock is a type of Chinese-built railway passenger coaches operated by China Railway.

Railway coaches of China